The Africa Movie Academy Award for Best Sound is an annual merit by the Africa Film Academy to reward films with the most adjured and euphoric sound for the year.

References

Lists of award winners
Africa Movie Academy Awards